Cabo Verde Airlines is an international airline based in Cape Verde. It connects  three continents with non-stop flights from their hub at Amílcar Cabral International Airport on Sal Island.

History
Cabo Verde Airlines was established in 1958. In July 1975, following the independence of Cape Verde, the airline was designated as the national carrier and became a public (state-owned) company in 1983. The airline was formerly TACV, and its logo included a blue wing with seven lines that represented the number of domestic inter-island flights offered by the airline. Until 1984, it served 8 of the 9 inhabited islands. Unacceptable safety standards at some of the country's other airports, namely Esperadinha Airport and Agostinho Neto Airport, led to the cancellation of flights to those islands.  Subsequently, Brava's airport closed in 2003 and Santo Antão's closed in 2007. European flights began in 1985, with Lisbon as the first European destination. Also that year, the airline began services to Boston, Massachusetts, US using a McDonnell Douglas DC-10 provided by LAM Mozambique Airlines. In 1996 Cabo Verde Airlines received its first Boeing 757-200, brand new, direct from the Boeing factory, in Seattle, considered as “the pride and joy of Cape Verde Airlines", baptized with the name B.Leza. With B.Leza (registration D4-CBG), Cabo Verde Airlines began flying to Europe with its own aircraft and crew. Cabo Verde Airlines was the country's only airline until 1998 when Cabo Verde Express began operations.  All of its international flights were at Sal until 2004. In 2004, another Boeing 757-200 named Emigranti (registration D4-CBP) joined the Cabo Verde Airlines fleet. For several years, the two Boeing 757s served all of Cabo Verde Airlines' international routes.

In June 2015, the airline opened two new air routes to Recife and Providence, Rhode Island, the latter replaced Boston's Logan International Airport, also its flight with Bissau resumed and served as a biweekly flight via Dakar, operated by the ATR 72 aircraft.

In August 2017, the Cape Verdean government signed an agreement with Loftleidir Icelandic, part of the Icelandair Group, which turned the administration of Cabo Verde Airlines to the Icelandic group. The new administration discontinued the hub at Praia International Airport and moved the airline's hub to Amílcar Cabral International Airport. The new hub serving the Americas, Europe and Africa.

On November 5, 2017, Icelandair transferred the first Boeing 757-200 to the airline which was used to reinforce existing routes and to operate daily flights to Lisbon and flights to Fortaleza and Recife.

In May 2018, the airline announced it would rebrand as Cabo Verde Airlines in order to strengthen the connection of the national air carrier with its country. Cabo Verde Airlines has increased the country's connectivity with the world, with new routes to Salvador de Bahia, Milan, Paris, Lisbon, and Rome.  The carrier also increased routes to Recife and Fortaleza. Loftleidir is wet leasing two B757-200s to the airline.

On March 1, 2019, Loftleidir paid 1.3 million euros (or 51% of shares) for the heavily indebted Cabo Verde Airlines, which resulted in it becoming the majority owner of the company. Soon after, Loftleidir nominated a new CEO for Cabo Verde Airlines. In June 2021, it was announced that Cabo Verde Airlines would get a new board of directors soon and start the restructuring and resizing phase of the company as well.

Destinations

Fleet

, the Cabo Verde Airlines fleet consists of the following aircraft:

Cabo Verde also operated 757-200's. They have now all been retired.

Accidents and incidents 
 TACV Flight 5002 took off from São Pedro at 11:42 on 7 August 1999 for the short flight to Agostinho Neto. Thirteen minutes after takeoff, rain and fog covered Santo Antão and placed the arrival airport below VFR minimums. The pilots made the decision to return to São Vicente at 11:56. The aircraft overflew the island of Santo Antão at 12:02, but crashed into the wooded mountainside at an altitude of 1,370 metres (4,490 ft). The aircraft burst into flames, killing all 18 passengers and crew on board.

References

External links

 Official website

1950s establishments in Cape Verde
Airlines established in 1958
Airlines of Cape Verde
Government-owned airlines
Companies based in Praia
Espargos
1958 establishments in the Portuguese Empire